Patrick Lee may refer to:

Pat Lee (American football) (Patrick Christopher Lee, born 1984), cornerback for the Green Bay Packers

Patrick Lee (bishop) (1931–2010), Anglican bishop in Canada
Patrick Lee (Chinese businessman), founder of Lee & Man Paper in Hong Kong
Patrick Lee (medical researcher), reovirus and cancer therapy researcher at Dalhousie University
Patrick Lee (novelist) (born 1976), American author
Patrick Lee (painter) (born 1948), Taiwanese painter
Patrick A. Lee (born 1946), professor of physics
Patrick Lee (banker) (born 1972), Singapore based banker, CEO of Standard Chartered Singapore
Patrick Y. Lee, one of the founders of Rotten Tomatoes

See also
Pat Lee (disambiguation)
Lee Patrick (disambiguation)